The 2022 SGB Premiership was the 87th season of the top tier of British speedway and the 5th known as the SGB Premiership. Sheffield Tigers topped the regular season table and met Belle Vue Aces in the play off final but Belle Vue ran out the winners to claim their 13th league title.

2022 summary
The same six clubs as 2021 competed for the league championship, with Swindon once again sitting out due to the development of their stadium. The Rising Star scheme introduced in 2021, has been extended for the 2022 season, allowing clubs to select an additional Rising Star rider as a 'Number 8' for the season.

A new League Cup competition was introduced, with a regional group stage determining the finalists, the event was won by Sheffield Tigers. There was no place for the traditional Knockout Cup. Also re–introduced for the new season, was the SGB Premiership Pairs competition, but over six legs. The event was won by Ipswich Witches, with the sixth leg cancelled due to fixture congestion. However, the additional fixtures created an issue due to the suspension of fixtures during the Death and state funeral of Elizabeth II and the heavy rain during October. In retrospect additional events could have been added after the completion of the league and knockout cup fixtures.

Belle Vue brought in Robert Lambert as a late season injury replacement for Max Fricke and Lambert scored a 15 point maximum in the play off final 1st leg. The signing of Lambert was pivotal as Belle Vue held on to win the play offs on aggregate score, despite Sheffield winning the second leg. Sheffield gained some compensation for the defeat when easily beating King's Lynn in the League Cup final.

Regular season
League Table

A Fixtures

B Fixtures

League Scoring System

Home loss by any number of points = 0
Home draw = (see Super Heat)
Home win by any number of points = 3
Away loss by 7 points or more = 0
Away loss by 6 points or less = 1
Away draw = (see Super Heat)
Away win by between 1 and 6 points = 3
Away win by 7 points or more = 4
Super Heat win = 3
Super Heat loss = 1

Super Heat
In meetings after heat 15 when the score is level, a Super Heat will be used to determine the winner.
The Team Manager, at their discretion may select any two of their seven riders.
The Super Heat will take place with the following scoring system to determine the winner of the meeting: 1st 4 points, 2nd 3 points, 3rd 2 points, 4th 0 points.
If a meeting is abandoned for any reason after the staging of heat 10, the scores are level and no more heats can take place (e.g. Super Heat), the match will be awarded. Each team will be awarded 2 points.

Premiership play-offs

Draw

Home team scores are in bold
Overall aggregate scores are in red

Grand Final
First leg

Second Leg

League Cup

Group stages

Northern Group

Fixtures

Table

Southern Group

Fixtures

Table

Final
The two group winners, the Kings Lynn Stars and the Sheffield Tigers both qualified for the final, which was won by Sheffield over two legs.

First Leg

Second Leg

Pairs Championship
Each of the six Premiership club were supposed to have staged a round of the pairs championship at their track, with the highest placed side after the six rounds declared Premiership Pairs Champions but Ipswich were declared winners after only five rounds were held. Teams tracked two of their top four riders, plus the Rising Star as a reserve, at each meeting. The highest placed side after the qualifying heats qualified for the final, with second and third competing in the semi final.

Standings

red indicates home team, bold indicates winners

Rounds

Round One

Qualifying Heats

Semi Final

Final

Round Two

Qualifying Heats

Semi Final

Final

Round Three

Qualifying Heats

Semi Final

Final

Round Four

Qualifying Heats

Semi Final

Final

Leading averages

averages include league, play offs & league cup, min 6 matches

Squads & final averages

Belle Vue Aces
 8.96
 (C) 8.76
 8.41
 7.25
 (Rising Star) 6.43
 5.89
 5.09
 n/a

Ipswich Witches
 10.53
 7.83
 6.98
 (C) 6.93
 6.64
 6.00
 5.25
 (Number 8) 5.65
 (Rising Star) 5.14
 4.00

King's Lynn Stars
 8.32
 8.00
 (C) 7.45
 7.45
 7.35
 7.03
 6.83
 5.16
 (Rising Star) 3.39
 (Number 8) 2.78

Peterborough Panthers
 8.14
 6.91
 6.81
 5.73
 (C) 5.62
 5.53
 (Rising Star) 2.77
 1.88
 (Number 8) 0.44

Sheffield Tigers
 9.04
 8.67
 7.57
 (C) 6.77
 6.00
 5.56
 (Rising Star) 5.26
 3.56
 4.75
 (Number 8) 2.67
 2.40

Wolverhampton Wolves
 (C) 9.10
 8.23
 7.79
 7.60
 7.33
 (Rising Star) 4.25
 3.65
 (Number 8) 2.00

See also
SGB Championship 2022
SGB National Development League 2022
British Speedway League Champions

References

SGB Premiership
SGB Premiership
SGB Premiership